Aequorivita todarodis  is a Gram-negative, aerobic, rod-shaped and non-motile bacterium from the genus of Aequorivita which has been isolated from the intestinal tract of squid (Todarodes pacificus).

References

Flavobacteria
Bacteria described in 2018